A fair day's wage for a fair day's work is an objective of the labor movement, trade unions and other workers' groups, to increase pay, and adopt reasonable hours of work. It is a motto of the American Federation of Labor.

Critique
In 1881 Frederick Engels criticised the slogan in the first issue of The Labour Standard. He argued that workers exchange their full labour power for a day in return for the subsistence necessary to maintain them for a day: "The workman gives as much, the Capitalist gives as little, as the nature of the bargain will admit." He also points out that capitalists can force a better bargain as they can live off their capital, but workers, without reserves, will be forced to accept work at a less advantageous rate. As innovation continually replaces workers with machines, he argues, workers come to form an industrial reserve army. Further, he argues that the wealth of capitalists has been accumulated through the exploitation of workers. He ends up calling for the old motto to be buried for ever and replaced by another motto:
"Possession of the Means of Work, Raw Material, Factories, Machinery, By the Working People Themselves."

That critique was taken up by the Industrial Workers of the World, who embodied it in their preamble:
"Instead of the conservative motto, 'A fair day's wage for a fair day's work,' we must inscribe on our banner the revolutionary watchword, 'Abolition of the wage system.'"

References

WP Quigley, 'Fair Day's Pay for a Fair Day's Work: Time to Raise and Index the Minimum Wage' (1995) Mary's LJ

External links 
"A Fair Day's Wages for a Fair Day's Work" by Friedrich Engels, published 1881 in The Labour Standard

American political catchphrases
Labour movement